Emperatriz may refer to:
 Emperatriz (Mexican TV series), a 2011 telenovela
 Emperatriz (Venezuelan TV series), a 1990 telenovela